Merindad de Río Ubierna is a municipality located in the province of Burgos, Castile and León, Spain. According to the 2004 census (INE), the municipality has a population of 1,389 inhabitants. Its seat is in Sotopalacios.

People from Merindad de Río Ubierna 
Andrés Díaz Venero de Leiva (?-1578) - Colonial governor of the New Kingdom of Granada.

References 

Municipalities in the Province of Burgos